Sandra Smith may refer to:

Sandra L. Smith, former leader of the Communist Party of Canada (Marxist-Leninist)
Sandra Dorne (1924–1992), née Smith, actress
Sandra Smith (actress), retired American actress 
Sandra Smith (criminal) (1965–1989), South African woman sentenced to death for murder, the last woman to be executed in the country
Sandra Smith (reporter) (born 1980), reporter for the Fox Business Network in New York City
Sandra Smith (cyclist) (born 1968), Australian Paralympian